Categoría Primera B, commonly referred to as Torneo BetPlay Dimayor due to sponsorship by online betting company BetPlay (formerly Torneo Águila), is the second-division football league in Colombia.

Format
DIMAYOR has applied a new format from 2015 onwards because of the expansion to 20 teams in the Primera A tournament. The league will no longer have Apertura and Finalización seasons but rather a yearlong tournament with home and away games. The first phase of the tournament is everyone against everyone home and away games. The second is a two-groups phase with the 8 top teams from the season who play each other to determine the winners of each group. The winners of the two groups are both promoted to the Primera A and play the final in home and away games to determine the champion of the season.

Current teams

Seasons by club
This is the complete list of the clubs that have taken part in the Categoría Primera B, founded in 1991, until the 2021 season. Teams who currently play are indicated in bold.

 31 seasons: Leones (Deportivo Rionegro)
 22 seasons: Alianza Petrolera
 21 seasons: Real Cartagena
 18 seasons: Bogotá
 18 seasons: Tigres (Expreso Rojo)
 18 seasons: Valledupar
 17 seasons: Atlético (Dépor, Dépor Aguablanca, Dépor Jamundí)
 17 seasons: Barranquilla
 17 seasons: Unión Magdalena
 16 seasons: Cortuluá
 15 seasons: Real Santander (Real San Andrés)
 14 seasons: Bello (Atlético Bello)
 14 seasons: Club El Cóndor (Cóndor Real Bogotá, Deportivo El Cóndor)
 14 seasons: Cúcuta Deportivo (Cúcuta 2001)
 14 seasons: Girardot
 11 seasons: Deportivo Pereira
 10 seasons: Llaneros
 9 seasons: Centauros Villavicencio
 9 seasons: Deportes Quindío
 9 seasons: Fortaleza
 9 seasons: Lanceros
 9 seasons: Patriotas
 8 seasons: Academia
 8 seasons: Alianza Llanos
 8 seasons: Atlético Bucaramanga
 8 seasons: Universitario Popayán
 6 seasons: Atlético Huila
 6 seasons: Boyacá Chicó (Bogotá Chicó)
 6 seasons: Deportivo Antioquia
 6 seasons: Itagüí
 6 seasons: Orsomarso

 5 seasons: Academia Bogotana
 5 seasons: América de Cali
 5 seasons: Atlético Buenaventura
 5 seasons: Bajo Cauca
 5 seasons: Cooperamos Tolima
 5 seasons: Deportivo Pasto
 5 seasons: Escuela Carlos Sarmiento Lora
 5 seasons: Pumas de Casanare
 4 seasons: Atlético Córdoba
 4 seasons: Chía (Chía Fair Play, Club Fair Play)
 4 seasons: La Equidad
 3 seasons: Atlético Juventud (Juventud Soacha)
 3 seasons: Boca Juniors de Cali
 3 seasons: Palmira F.C.
 3 seasons: Córdoba
 3 seasons: Deportivo Unicosta
 3 seasons: Expreso Palmira
 3 seasons: Fiorentina
 3 seasons: Independiente Popayán
 3 seasons: Itagüí Ditaires
 3 seasons: Uniautónoma
 2 seasons: Atlético de la Sabana
 2 seasons: Soledad
 2 seasons: Deportes Dinastía
 2 seasons: Deportivo Armenia
 2 seasons: Dimerco Popayán
 2 seasons: El Cerrito
 2 seasons: Envigado
 2 seasons: Guadalajara
 2 seasons: Industrial Itagüí
 2 seasons: Jaguares

 2 seasons: Johann
 2 seasons: Pacífico
 2 seasons: Real Floridablanca
 2 seasons: Real Sincelejo
 2 seasons: River Plate
 2 seasons: Unión Soacha
 1 season: América de Cali B
 1 season: Atlético Barranquilla
 1 season: Atlético Huila B
 1 season: Atlético Nacional B
 1 season: Atlético Popayán
 1 season: Cartago
 1 season: Cortuluá B
 1 season: Deportes Palmira
 1 season: Deportes Risaralda
 1 season: Deportes Tolima
 1 season: Deportes Tolima B
 1 season: Deportivo Cali B
 1 season: Deportivo Pereira B
 1 season: Ferroclub Pereira
 1 season: Florida Soccer
 1 season: Independiente Medellín B
 1 season: Junior B
 1 season: Millonarios B
 1 season: Once Caldas B
 1 season: Real Cartagena B
 1 season: Samarios
 1 season: Santa Fe B
 1 season: Sucre
 1 season: Unión Meta
 1 season: Univalle

List of champions

Titles by club
As of 21 November 2022

References

External links 

Dimayor Official Website(Spanish)
Colombian Federation(Spanish)
FiFa Association(English)

 
2
Colombia